Owbeh Bolaghi (also Romanized as Owbeh Bolāghī; also known as Ūbā Bolāghī) is a village in Chaharduli Rural District, Keshavarz District, Shahin Dezh County, West Azerbaijan Province, Iran. In 2006, its population was 133, in 27 families.

References 

Populated places in Shahin Dezh County